The Dent de Brenleire is a mountain of the Fribourg Alps, located south of Charmey in the Swiss canton of Fribourg. It has an elevation of 2,353 metres above sea level and is amongst the highest summits in the canton of Fribourg, after the Vanil Noir, the Vanil de l'Ecri and the Pointe de Paray. It is also the highest mountain entirely within the canton.

The summit of the Dent de Brenleire is accessible by a trail running on the east side of the mountain, from the Gros Mont.

References

External links
 Dent de Brenleire on Hikr

Mountains of the Alps
Two-thousanders of Switzerland
Mountains of the canton of Fribourg
Mountains of Switzerland